The Rubim do Sul River is a river of Minas Gerais state in southeastern Brazil.

See also
 List of rivers of Minas Gerais

References

Rivers of Minas Gerais